Allodecta is a monotypic genus of  jumping spiders containing the single species, Allodecta maxillaris. It was first described by Elizabeth B. Bryant in 1950, and is only found on the Greater Antilles.

References

Endemic fauna of Jamaica
Monotypic Salticidae genera
Salticidae
Spiders of the Caribbean
Arthropods of the Dominican Republic